The 1926 Hammond Pros season was their seventh and final season in the league. The team failed to improve on their previous output of 1–4, losing all their games. They finished twenty-first in the league.

Schedule

Standings

References

Hammond Pros seasons
Hammond Pros
1926 in sports in Indiana
National Football League winless seasons